Strahinja Bunčić (born 5 January 1996) is a Serbian judoka. He won European U-23 Championships bronze in 2017 in Podgorica.  He took bronze in the Champions League in 2019 with Red Star Belgrade.

Achievements

References

External links
 

1996 births
Living people
Serbian male judoka
European Games competitors for Serbia
Judoka at the 2019 European Games
Sportspeople from Banja Luka
Competitors at the 2022 Mediterranean Games
Mediterranean Games bronze medalists for Serbia
Mediterranean Games medalists in judo
Serbs of Bosnia and Herzegovina